The 2017 Sacred Heart Pioneers football team represented Sacred Heart University in the 2017 NCAA Division I FCS football season. They were led by fifth-year head coach Mark Nofri and played their home games at Campus Field. They were a member of the Northeast Conference. They finished the season 4–7, 2–4 in NEC play to finish in a tie for fifth place.

Schedule

Source: Schedule

References

Sacred Heart
Sacred Heart Pioneers football seasons
Sacred Heart Pioneers football